H1 Unlimited is an American Unlimited Hydroplane racing league that is sanctioned by the American Power Boat Association (APBA). Until 2009, the series was known as ABRA Unlimited Hydroplane, in turn renamed from APBA Unlimited Hydroplane in 2004. The H1 Unlimited season typically runs from July through September, consisting of five races.

A hydroplane (or hydro, or thunderboat) is a very specific type of motorboat used exclusively for racing. One of the unique characteristics about hydroplanes is that they only use the water they're on for propulsion and steering (not for flotation) - when going at full speed they are primarily held aloft by a principle of fluid dynamics known as "planing," with only a tiny fraction of their hull actually touching the water.

History

The unlimited hydroplane racing series was founded in 1946 when the unlimited class of boats was allowed to compete following World War II and the subsequent availability of surplus aircraft engines. It had been disbanded in 1922 in favor of the newly introduced "Gold Cup Class."

The world's first sanctioned unlimited hydroplane race was held  in 1903 in Ireland at Queenstown, and was very modest by later race standards.

Hulls with "steps" or "shingles" on the underside were prohibited.

One reason for the rule change was to end the domination of its star driver, Gar Wood, who had won five consecutive Gold Cups from 1917. One win in 1920 in his twin Liberty L-12 powered Miss America, averaged  in the  race over an  course and set a race record that stood until 1946. "King Gar" had entered fifteen Gold Cup heats during those pinnacle years. He finished first twelve times and second three times. Throughout the years, only two boats showed up to challenge Miss America; one of those was piloted by George Wood, Gar's younger brother, in Miss Chicago. Another reason for the rule change was to make racing more affordable.

In 1929, the  Class was introduced by the Mississippi Valley Power Boat Association (MVPBA).  The majority of these boats were powered by Hispano-Suiza 8 aircraft engines or Curtiss OX-5s. These boats were popular in the Southern and Midwestern US, but did not attract the media attention that the expensive and exotic-looking Gold Cup Class counterparts had.

In 1946 after the hiatus due to the war, the MVPBA was absorbed into the APBA, and as a result the 725s and the Gold Cups merged to become the APBA Unlimited Class.

Following the protest-ridden 1956 APBA Gold Cup at Detroit, which took 85 days to settle, the Unlimited Class severed all but nominal ties with the APBA. In 1957, the Unlimited Racing Commission (URC) was formed. In the 1990s, the URC was renamed the Unlimited Hydroplane Racing Association (UHRA). In 2001, HYDRO-PROP, Inc., bought the licensing rights to the Unlimited Class from the APBA and managed the unlimited class through the 2004 racing season. The American Boat Racing Association (ABRA) was formed in 2005 and was renamed H1 Unlimited in 2009.

The turbine engine was first used in competition by the U-95 "Whiz-per" in 1974, which sank that August at Seattle. The next entrant with turbine power was the Pay 'n Pak in 1980 on the Columbia River at Tri-Cities, but it flipped 2½ times in a test run prior to the Sunday heats. It was the sole turbine again the following year, but through the 1980s, the turbine gradually displaced piston power.

Today

The H1 Unlimited class is sanctioned by APBA, its governing body in North America and UIM, its international body.

The modern turbine-powered unlimited hydroplane is derived from the 3-point prop-riding hydroplanes of the 1950s. These were the first boats to ride on a cushion of air trapped between "sponsons" mounted on the sides of the front of the boat, and the bottom half of the propeller, which were all that touched the water.

They were called "Unlimited" because they were the only class of boat racing the APBA that had no restrictions on the displacement size of their piston engines. The designation Unlimited has stayed with the class in the turbine era, even though there are restrictions on the turbine engine and its fuel.

Almost all the H1 Unlimited hydroplanes are powered by Lycoming T55 turbine engines, originally used in Chinook helicopters. As of 2015, the U-3 Go3 Racing is the only piston powered boat in the fleet, powered by a dual turbocharged Allison V-12.

Past National High Point Champions
Since 1946, the National High Point Championships are awarded to the team and to the driver with the most points at the end of the season.  The Martini & Rossi National Champion Perpetual Trophy was first awarded in 1959, and the Bill Muncey Trophy was first awarded in 2007.

Standing All-Time Competition and Qualifying Speed Records 
Source:

References

External links
 H1 Unlimited Website

 
Racing motorboats
Auto racing organizations
Motorsport in the United States
Hydroplanes
Sports leagues in the United States
Motorboat racing
1946 establishments in the United States
Sports leagues established in 1946